= Tai Chung =

Tai Chung may refer to:

== Places ==
- Taichung, a city located in west-central Taiwan.

== Miscellaneous ==
- Tai Chung FC, a football club in Hong Kong.
